Keith Douglas Stewart, Baron Stewart of Dirleton  (born 31 October 1965) is a British lawyer who specialises in criminal law. He was appointed Advocate General for Scotland on 15 October 2020, succeeding Lord Keen of Elie who resigned over United Kingdom Internal Market Bill.

Early life
Lord Stewart attended Dirleton Primary School and George Heriot's School before attaining a degree in English at Keble College, Oxford. He received his LLB in the University of Edinburgh and his diploma in the University of Strathclyde.

He was called to the bar in 1993 and was appointed Queen's Counsel in 2011.

Advocate General for Scotland
Stewart was appointed Advocate General for Scotland on 15 October 2020 after the position had been vacant for a month. He was created Baron Stewart of Dirleton, of Dirleton in the County of East Lothian, on 6 November 2020, and was introduced to the House of Lords on 9 November 2020.

References

 

Living people
1965 births
Alumni of the University of Edinburgh
Alumni of the University of Strathclyde
Scottish King's Counsel
Alumni of Keble College, Oxford
Scottish Conservative Party politicians
Advocates General for Scotland
Conservative Party (UK) life peers
Life peers created by Elizabeth II
21st-century King's Counsel